Previously known as the World Youth Netball Championships, the Netball World Youth Cup (since 2017) is the world championships of netball for national U21 teams, with all players being aged 21 years or younger. As part of the Australian Bicentenary celebrations in 1988 (Australia was founded in 1788), a new international tournament for youth took place in Canberra, the capital city of Australia. Its success led to this event being held once every four years. The most recent tournament was held in Gaborone in 2017, with New Zealand taking the title.

In the lead up to the 2009 World Youth Championship in the Cook Islands, there was considerable anxiety over the facilities, and whether they would be up to standards. The prime minister reconfirmed that his government would deliver a new venue. Before this, the International Netball Federation also reaffirmed their support for hosting the event in the Cook Islands. The Chinese government had offered to step in and loan the country NZ$9.3 million to help pay the costs for constructing the facility. The loan was controversial as some organizations felt the country had misplaced priorities. During that period, the government also sought to increase the size of the loan for the facility to $13 million NZD. The opposition leader Norman George was very unhappy with how the government handled the whole situation regarding new sporting facilities to be built for the World Youth Netball Championships and the 2009 Pacific Mini Games.

Editions

References

Bibliography

 
 
 
 
 

Youth
Youth netball